German submarine U-479 was a Type VIIC U-boat built for Nazi Germany's Kriegsmarine for service during World War II.
She was laid down at the Deutsche Werke in Kiel on 19 November 1942 as yard number 310, launched on 14 August 1943 and was commissioned  on 27 October 1943 with Oberleutnant zur See Hans-Joachim Förster, a Knights Cross winner, in command. He was replaced shortly afterwards by Oberleutnant Friedrich-Wilhelm Sons.

Design
German Type VIIC submarines were preceded by the shorter Type VIIB submarines. U-479 had a displacement of  when at the surface and  while submerged. She had two shafts and two  propellers.

U-479 was fitted with five  torpedo tubes (four fitted at the bow and one at the stern), fourteen torpedoes, one  SK C/35 naval gun, (220 rounds), one  Flak M42 and two twin  C/30 anti-aircraft guns. The boat had a complement of between forty-four and sixty.

Service history
The boat began her service career as part of the 5th U-boat Flotilla for training, before moving to the 8th flotilla for operations. She sank no ships during her career, but on 18 July 1944 U-479 torpedoed and damaged the Soviet submarine-chaser MO-304 in Vyborg bay.

The U-boat's first patrol was preceded by short voyages from Kiel to Arendal (on the southern Norwegian coast near Kristiansand), back to Kiel and then on to Helsinki in Finland.

First patrol
Her first foray proper saw her depart Helsinki on 13 July 1944, arrive at Esplanade (on the southern Finnish coast) on 25 July and move back to Helsinki on 1 August.

Second and third patrols
Her second and third sorties were both launched from Helsinki in August and were uneventful.

Fourth patrol
The submarine's fourth patrol was only different from her second and third efforts in that it terminated at Danzig, (now Gdansk).

Loss
The U-boat was sunk by a Soviet naval mine in the Gulf of Finland on 27 November 1944. She was found in 2009, explored in the summer of 2014 and 2018, sonar surveys by Estonian vessel VLT-089 on July 24, 2018; and filmed on 8–9 September 2018 by Finnish vessel Deep Explorer and on October 10, 2018, by Estonian vessel VLT-089 in position  in Estonian waters.

Summary of raiding history

References

Notes

Citations

Bibliography

External links

 3D image of sunken U-479 submarine 

World War II submarines of Germany
1942 ships
Ships built in Kiel
U-boats commissioned in 1943
World War II shipwrecks in the Baltic Sea
Shipwrecks in the Gulf of Finland
German Type VIIC submarines
Ships lost with all hands
U-boats sunk in 1944
U-boats sunk by mines
Maritime incidents in November 1944